The Fântâna Fătului is a right tributary of the river Balasan in Romania. It flows into the Balasan near Catane.

References

Rivers of Romania
Rivers of Dolj County